Sepilok Orangutan Rehabilitation Centre is located about 25 kilometres west of Sandakan in the state of Sabah, Malaysia.

The centre opened in 1964 as the first official orangutan rehabilitation project for rescued orphaned baby orangutans from logging sites, plantations, illegal hunting or kept as pets. The orphaned orangutans are trained to survive again in the wild and are released as soon as they are ready. Today around 60 to 80 orangutans are living free in the reserve.

The activities of the centre have featured in television series including "Paul O'Grady's Animal Orphans" and Animal Planet's "Meet the Orangutans".

In October 2014 the centre opened a section where visitors can view the nursery area where the younger Orangutans first learn to be outside and play on a large climbing frame. This consists of 2 large indoor seating areas (one with air conditioning and one with fans only) with a large window that overlooks the play area.

See also
 Among The Great Apes With Michelle Yeoh (Documentary about the Sepilok Orang Utan Sanctuary)

References

External links

Orang Utan and other wildlife in Sepilok rainforest reserve.
Sepilok Orang Utan Rehabilitation Centre
 

Sandakan
Wildlife sanctuaries of Malaysia
Borneo
Orangutan conservation
Primate sanctuaries
Protected areas of Sabah
1964 establishments in Malaysia